A gunboat is a naval watercraft designed for the express purpose of carrying one or more guns to bombard coastal targets, as opposed to those military craft designed for naval warfare, or for ferrying troops or supplies.

History

Pre-steam era 
In the age of sail, a gunboat was usually a small undecked vessel carrying a single smoothbore cannon in the bow, or just two or three such cannons. A gunboat could carry one or two masts or be oar-powered only, but the single-masted version of about  length was most typical. Some types of gunboats carried two cannons, or else mounted a number of swivel guns on the railings.

The small gunboat had advantages: if it only carried a single cannon, the boat could manoeuvre in shallow or restricted areas – such as rivers or lakes – where larger ships could sail only with difficulty. The gun that such boats carried could be quite heavy; a 32-pounder for instance. As such boats were cheap and quick to build, naval forces favoured swarm tactics: while a single hit from a frigate's broadside would destroy a gunboat, a frigate facing a large squadron of gunboats could suffer serious damage before it could manage to sink them all. For example: in the Battle of Alvøen (1808) during the Gunboat War of 1807–1814, five Dano-Norwegian gunboats defeated the lone frigate . Gunboats used in the Battle of Valcour Island (1776) on Lake Champlain during the American Revolutionary War were mostly built on the spot, attesting to the speed of their construction.

All navies of the sailing era kept a number of gunboats on hand. Gunboats saw extensive use in the Baltic Sea during the late 18th century as they were well-suited for the extensive coastal skerries and archipelagoes of Sweden, Finland and Russia. The rivalry between Sweden and Russia, in particular, led to an intense expansion of gunboat fleets and the development of new gunboat types. The two countries clashed during the Russo-Swedish war of 1788–90, a conflict that culminated in the massive Battle of Svensksund in 1790, in which over 30,000 men and hundreds of gunboats, galleys and other oared craft took part. The majority of these were vessels developed from the 1770s and onwards by the naval architect Fredrik Henrik af Chapman for the Swedish archipelago fleet. The designs, copied and refined by the rival Danish and Russian navies, spread to the Mediterranean and to the Black Sea.

Two variants occurred most commonly:
 a larger  "gun sloop" (from the Swedish kanonslup) with two 24-pounders, one in the stern and one in the bow
 a smaller  "gun yawl" (kanonjolle) with a single 24-pounder

Many of the Baltic navies kept gunboats in service well into the second half of the 19th century. British ships engaged larger  Russian gunboats off Turku in southeast Finland in 1854 during the Crimean War. The Russian vessels had the distinction of being the last oared vessels of war in history to fire their guns in anger.

Gunboats played a key role in Napoleon Bonaparte's plan for the invasion of England in 1804. Denmark-Norway used them heavily in the Gunboat War. Between 1803 and 1812 the United States Navy had a policy of basing its navy on coastal gunboats, experimenting with a variety of designs. President Thomas Jefferson (in office: 1801–1809) and his Democratic-Republican Party opposed a strong navy, regarding gunboats as adequate to defend the United States' major harbors. They proved useless against the British blockade during the War of 1812.

Steam era

With the introduction of steam power in the early 19th century, the Royal Navy and other navies built considerable numbers of small vessels propelled by side paddles and later by screws. Initially, these vessels retained full sailing rigs and used steam engines for auxiliary propulsion.

The British Royal Navy deployed two wooden paddle-gunboats in the Lower Great Lakes and St. Lawrence River during the Rebellions of 1837 in Upper and Lower Canada. The United States Navy deployed an iron-hulled paddle gunboat, to the Great Lakes in 1844.

 became the first propeller-driven gunboat in the world. Conradi shipyards in Kiel built the steam-powered  gunboat in 1849 for the small navy of Schleswig-Holstein. Initially called "Gunboat No. 1", Von der Tann was the most modern ship in the navy. She participated successfully in the First Schleswig War of 1848–1851.

Britain built a large number of wooden screw-gunboats during the 1850s, some of which participated in the Crimean War (1853–1856), Second Opium War (1856–1860) and Indian Mutiny (1857–1859). The requirement for gunboats in the Crimean War was formulated in 1854 to allow the Royal Navy to bombard shore facilities in the Baltic. The first ships the Royal Navy built that met this requirement were the s. Then in mid-1854 the Royal Navy ordered six s followed later in the year by an order for 20 s.  In May 1855 the Royal Navy deployed six Dapper-class gunboats in the Sea of Azov, where they repeatedly raided and destroyed stores around its coast. In June 1855 the Royal Navy reentered the Baltic with a total of 18 gunboats as part of a larger fleet. The gunboats attacked various coastal facilities, operating alongside larger British warships from which they drew supplies such as coal.

Gunboats experienced a revival during the American Civil War (1861–1865). Union and Confederate forces quickly converted existing passenger-carrying boats into armed sidewheel steamers. They frequently mounted 12 or more guns, sometimes of rather large caliber, and usually carried some armor. At the same time, Britain's gunboats from the Crimean War period were starting to wear out, so a new series of classes was ordered. Construction shifted from a purely wooden hull to an iron–teak composite.

In the later 19th century and early 20th century, "gunboat" was the common name for smaller armed vessels. These could be classified, from the smallest to the largest, into river gunboats, river monitors, coastal-defense gunboats (such as ), and full-fledged monitors for coastal bombardments. In the 1870s and 1880s, Britain took to building so-called "flat-iron" (or Rendel) gunboats for coastal defence.

In the United States Navy, these boats had the hull classification symbol "PG", which led to their being referred to as "patrol gunboats". An important characteristic of these was the ability to operate in rivers, enabling them to reach inland targets in a way not otherwise possible before the development of aircraft. In this period the naval powers used gunboats for police actions in colonies or in weaker countries, for example in China (see e.g. Yangtze Patrol). This category of gunboat inspired the term "gunboat diplomacy". With the addition of torpedoes, they became "torpedo gunboats", designated by the hull classification symbol "PTG" (Patrol Torpedo Gunboat).

In Britain, Admiral Fisher's reforms in the 1900s saw the disposal of much of the gunboat fleet. A handful remained in service in various roles at the start of World War I in 1914. The last in active service were two of the second  which survived until 1926, carrying out river patrols in west Africa.

In the circumstances of World War I (1914–1918), however, the Royal Navy re-equipped with small , shallow-draught gunboats (12 ships of the ) with sufficient speed to operate in fast-flowing rivers and with relatively heavy armament. During the war and in the post-war period, these were deployed in Romania on the Danube, in Mesopotamia on the Euphrates and Tigris, in northern Russia on the Northern Dvina and in China on the Yangtze. In China, during anarchic and war conditions, they continued to protect British interests until World War II; other western Powers acted similarly.

More and larger gunboats were built in the late 1930s for the Far East. Some sailed there; others were transported in sections and reassembled at Shanghai.

World War II

United Kingdom
Most British gunboats were based initially in East Asia. When war with Japan broke out, many of these vessels withdrew to the Indian Ocean.

Some were later redeployed to the Mediterranean theatre and supported land operations during the North African campaign, as well in parts of Southern Europe.

United States
In late 1941 the US Navy's Yangtze Patrol boats based in China were withdrawn to the Philippines or scuttled.  Following the US defeat in the Philippines most of the remaining craft were scuttled.  However,  survived until being sunk in action during the Battle of Java in 1942.

Soviet Union

During the 1930s, the Soviet Navy began developing small armoured riverboats or "riverine tanks": vessels displacing 26 to 48 tons, on which the turrets of tanks were mounted.

Three classes, numbering 210 vessels, saw service between 1934 and 1945:
 Project 1124:  their standard armament was initially two turrets from T-28 or T-34 tanks, each mounting a 76.2 mm gun and Degtyaryov tank machine gun (DT), as well as two anti-aircraft machine guns – in some cases the rear turret was replaced with a Katyusha rocket-launcher
 : one T-28/T-34 turret with a 76.2 mm gun and DT, as well as four AA machine guns
 S-40: one T-34 turret with a 76.2 mm gun and DT, as well as four AA machine guns

With crews of 10 to 20 personnel, riverine tanks displaced 26 to 48 tons, had armour 4–14 mm thick, and were 23 to 25 metres long. They saw significant action in the Baltic and Black Seas between 1941 and 1945.

Vietnam War

US riverine gunboats in the Vietnam War, included Patrol Boats River (PBR), constructed of fiberglass; Patrol Craft Fast (PCF), commonly known as Swift Boats, built of aluminum; and Assault Support Patrol Boats (ASPB) built of steel. U.S. Coast Guard 82-foot s supplemented these US Navy vessels. The ASPBs were commonly referred to as "Alpha" boats and primarily carried out mine-sweeping duties along the waterways, due to their all-steel construction. The ASPBs were the only US Navy riverine craft specifically designed and built for the Vietnam War. All of these boats were assigned to the US Navy's "Brownwater Navy".

Surviving vessels (incomplete)
 (1776) - USS Philadelphia resides at the National Museum of American History in Washington D.C.
 (1861) - USS Cairo is on display at the Vicksburg National Military Park in Vicksburg, Mississippi.
 (1863) - The remains of the CSS Chattahoochee are currently on display at the National Civil War Naval Museum in Columbus, Georgia.
(1905) -  BAP América resides in Iquitos Peru. 
 (1912) - SS Zhongshan is currently preserved in Wuhan, China.
 (1930) - ARP Humaitá (C2), Museum ship as of 1992 located in Asunción, Paraguay.
 (1936) - ARM Guanajuato (C-07), located in Boca del Río, Veracruz and is undergoing restoration.

See also
 Monitor (warship)
 River gunboat
 River monitor
 Torpedo gunboat
 List of gunboat and gunvessel classes of the Royal Navy
 
 
 
 
 
 
 
 
 
 
 TT-400TP gunboat
 NMS Grivița
 NMS Sublocotenent Ghiculescu

Notes

References
 Anderson, Roger Charles, Oared Fighting Ships: From classical times to the coming of steam. London. 1962.
 Chapelle, Howard, The History of the American Sailing Navy Norton. 1949.
 Friedman, Norman. US Small Combatants: An Illustrated Design History. 1987; Naval Institute Press. .
 Glete, Jan, Navies and Nations: Warships, Navies and State Building in Europe and America 1500–1860 (vol 2) Almqvist & Wiksell International, Stockholm. 1993. 
 Preston, John Antony, Send a Gunboat! The Victorian Navy and Supremacy at Sea, 1854–1904. Conway Maritime, London. 2007. .

External links

 HMS Gannet 

 

 
Ship types
Naval ships